Wightman School is a building in the Squirrel Hill neighborhood of  Pittsburgh, Pennsylvania, that was built in 1897. It was listed on the National Register of Historic Places in 1986.

Originally an elementary school named Colfax No. 5, the building was subsequently renamed Wightman School in honor of Thomas Wightman, owner of the Thomas Wightman Glass Company. The school operated from its opening in 1897 until it was closed by the Pittsburgh Public Schools in June 1980. Since 1981, the 40,000-square-foot space has been a community building comprising several small businesses and nonprofit organizations.

References

External links
 Wightman School Community Building

School buildings on the National Register of Historic Places in Pennsylvania
Neoclassical architecture in Pennsylvania
Romanesque Revival architecture in Pennsylvania
School buildings completed in 1897
Schools in Pittsburgh
National Register of Historic Places in Pittsburgh
1897 establishments in Pennsylvania